The FIBA Africa Championship 1970, was the fifth FIBA Africa Championship regional basketball championship held by FIBA Africa, which also served as Africa qualifier for the 1970 FIBA World Championship, granting one berth to the champion. It was held in Egypt between 9 March and 15 March 1970. Seven national teams entered the event under the auspices of FIBA Africa, the sport's regional governing body. The city of Alexandria hosted the tournament. Egypt won their third title after defeating Senegal in the final.

Format
Teams were split into two round-robin groups of four and three teams. The top two teams from each group advanced to the knockout semi-finals. The winners in the semi-finals competed for the championship, while the losing teams from the semifinals competed for third place in an extra game. The champion qualified for the 1970 FIBA World Championship.
The third teams from each group played an extra game to define fifth and sixth place in the final standings. The bottom team from the four-team group was placed seventh in the final standings.

First round

Group A

|}

Group B

|}

Knockout stage

Championship bracket

Semifinals

Third place

Final

Fifth place

Final standings

External links
 1970 African Championship for Men, FIBA.com.

1970 in Egyptian sport
1970 in African basketball
AfroBasket
International basketball competitions hosted by Egypt
March 1970 sports events in Africa